Hervé Gauthier (born 28 May 1949) is a retired French footballer and coach. 

He played for Stade Poitevin, Lille OSC, Stade Lavallois and RC Paris.

After his playing career, Gauthier became a coach with Ligue 1 and Ligue 2 clubs, such as Lille OSC and SM Caen.

References

External links
Profile

1949 births
Living people
Sportspeople from Ille-et-Vilaine
Footballers from Brittany
French footballers
Association football defenders
Lille OSC players
Stade Lavallois players
Racing Club de France Football players
Stade Poitevin FC players
Ligue 1 players
Ligue 2 players
French football managers
Angers SCO managers
Lille OSC managers
Stade Lavallois managers
Stade Malherbe Caen managers
Wasquehal Football managers
Étoile Sportive du Sahel managers
French expatriate football managers
Expatriate football managers in Tunisia
French expatriate sportspeople in Tunisia
Tunisian Ligue Professionnelle 1 managers